Tepidamorphus  is a genus of bacteria from the order Hyphomicrobiales.

References

Further reading 
 

Hyphomicrobiales
Monotypic bacteria genera
Bacteria genera